Mark Kastelic (born March 11, 1999) is an American professional ice hockey player for the Ottawa Senators of the National Hockey League (NHL). Kastelic was drafted in the fifth round of the 2019 NHL Entry Draft by the Senators.

Early life
Kastelic was born in Phoenix, Arizona. Kastelic played his youth ice hockey years with the Phoenix Jr. Coyotes teams while attending Desert Vista High School.

Playing career

Kastelic joined the Calgary Hitmen junior team of the Western Hockey League (WHL) in 2015. He played five seasons for the Hitmen. His best season was 2018–19 when he scored 47 goals and had 77 points. He served as team captain for the 2018–19 and 2019–20 seasons.

After his outstanding 2018–19 season, Kastelic was drafted in the 2019 NHL Entry Draft in the fifth round, 125th overall, as an over-age player. Kastelic signed a three-year, entry-level contract with the Senators. Kastelic returned to Calgary for the 2019–20 and 2020–21 seasons. In 2021, Kastelic made his professional debut, joining the Belleville Senators of the American Hockey League (AHL), Ottawa's primary minor-league affiliate.

Due to injuries to several Senators players, Kastelic was called up to Ottawa in January 2022. Kastelic made his NHL debut on January 29, 2022 against the Anaheim Ducks. On April 23, 2022, Kastelic scored his first two career NHL goals, including the eventual game winner, in a 6–4 win against the Montreal Canadiens.

During the  season, Kastelic made the Ottawa Senators out of training camp and became an NHL regular. Impressed with his play, general manager Pierre Dorion signed him to a two year $1.67 million contract on October 27, 2022.

Personal
Kastelic's father Ed is a former professional ice hockey player who played 220 games for the Washington Capitals and Hartford Whalers of the NHL. His grandfather Pat Stapleton played over 600 games for the Chicago Blackhawks and the Boston Bruins of the NHL. His uncle Mike Stapleton played 697 games in the NHL for several teams.

Career statistics

Regular season and playoffs

International

Awards and honors

References

External links

1999 births
Living people
Belleville Senators players
Calgary Hitmen players
Ottawa Senators draft picks
Ottawa Senators players
Sportspeople from the Phoenix metropolitan area